Edward Joseph McCarthy (19 March 1911 – 10 February 1997) was an Australian rules footballer who played with St Kilda in the Victorian Football League (VFL).

McCarthy played for Collingullie Football Club in 1933, playing a great game in their losing Wagga Australian Rules Football League grand final side to Wagga Wagga FC.

Notes

External links 

1911 births
1997 deaths
Australian rules footballers from Victoria (Australia)
St Kilda Football Club players